Jessica Robinson (sometimes credited as 'Jessica Close' or 'Jessica Daley') is an English singer and actress. Robinson is most noted for her participation in the 2010 BBC talent-search Over the Rainbow.

Background
Robinson lives with her parents and brother in Middlesbrough, North Yorkshire.

As a child, Robinson attended St Gabriel's Primary School followed by St Peter's Secondary School, in Middlesbrough.

As a youth Robinson performed as part of the Middlesbrough Youth Theatre in which she played the part of Fantine in Les Misérables, company and in 2006 also went on to compete the kids version of Stars in Their Eyes where she performed as the Australian actress/singer Natalie Imbruglia. Jessica took part in heat two. and the 2008 Miss Dance of Great Britain competition.

Over the Rainbow

Robinson took part in Over the Rainbow, a BBC talent-search looking for an actress/singer to play Dorothy Gale in Andrew Lloyd Webber's production of The Wizard of Oz. She advanced to the sixth week, whereupon she was voted off following a sing-off against Danielle Hope, the show's eventual winner.

Solo performances

After Over the Rainbow
Robinson studied at the Arts Educational School. She was lauded for her efforts at raising Middlesbrough's profile and performed at the 2010 Middlesbrough Music Live event with The Wildcats of Kilkenny.

In August 2010 it was announced that Robinson would temporarily take over fellow Over the Rainbow alumni Stephanie Fearon's role in Smokey Joe's Cafe. Robinson performed for three nights in late August while Fearon recovered after an operation.

Continuing to support her hometown's vibrant cultural scene, Robinson took the title role in the Christmas 2011 pantomime "Snow White" at Middlesbrough Little Theatre, and in April 2012 she starred in the video for Middlesbrough-based band Collectors Club's debut single, First to Know.

Robinson performed in Mamma Mia! on London's West End as Ali.

Robinson was part of the cast of Les Misérables Dubai.

Robinson is about to embark on the Evita International Tour, starting in China as Eva Perón

References

External links
 
 
 
 

Living people
English stage actresses
English musical theatre actresses
People from Middlesbrough
Year of birth missing (living people)